Wang Yifang (born February 1963 in Jiangsu) is a Chinese particle and accelerator physicist. He is director of the Institute of High Energy Physics (IHEP) of the Chinese Academy of Sciences in Beijing and known for contributions to neutrino physics, in particular his leading role (with Kam-Biu Luk) at Daya Bay Reactor Neutrino Experiment to determine the last unknown neutrino mixing angle θ 13 (see neutrino).

After earning his bachelor's degree in physics at  Nanjing University (1984) he was with Samuel CC Ting at the L3 experiment the Large Electron-Positron Collider (LEP) of CERN. Wang worked and studied at the University of Florence obtaining PhD in Physics, then worked at Laboratory for Nuclear Science of the Massachusetts Institute of Technology and at Stanford University and joined the Institute of High Energy Physics(IHEP), China in 2001 as a researcher and became the Director in 2011.

Awards and honors

Panofsky Prize (shared with Kam-Biu Luk) in 2014 
Breakthrough Prize in Fundamental Physics in 2016, with Kam-Biu Luk. 
Member of Chinese Academy of Sciences in 2015.
Member of The World Academy of Sciences in 2016.
2019 Future Science Prize
2022 Fellow of the American Physical Society

Since 2014 Wang has been Director of the Jiangmen Underground Neutrino Observatory (JUNO) in Southern China leading the experiment in an effect to determine the neutrino mass hierarchy with neutrinos from nuclear reactors.

References

1963 births
Living people
Members of the Chinese Academy of Sciences
Foreign Members of the Russian Academy of Sciences
Fellows of the American Physical Society
Physicists from Jiangsu
Scientists from Nanjing
TWAS fellows
Winners of the Panofsky Prize
Winners of the Nikkei Asia Prize
People associated with CERN